Holy Cross High School is a co-educational Catholic high school located in Flushing, in the New York City borough of Queens. Formerly a boys' school, the school began to admit girls from the 2018–19 academic year.

Founded in 1955, Holy Cross High School was chartered by the Board of Regents of the University of the State of New York and accredited by the Middle States Association of Colleges and Schools.  Located within the Roman Catholic Diocese of Brooklyn, the school is sponsored by the Brothers of Holy Cross. There is a 98% college placement rate.

The School's team is the Holy Cross Knights and the school's athletic archrival is the St. Francis Preparatory School Terriers.

History 
The concept of the first all-boys Catholic high school in Queens was conceived on the campus of the University of Notre Dame in the early 1940s out of a friendship between Msgr. Edmund Reilly, pastor of St. Thomas Aquinas Church (Flatlands) and Rev. Frederick Schulte, CSC. The Brothers of Holy Cross were invited to staff the Boys' Department of St. Thomas Aquinas in 1944 and St. Francis of Assisi in 1947. Within two months after coming to St. Thomas Aquinas, the Brothers were invited to establish a high school in the Bayside West section of Queens.

In September 1955, ten years after the initial plans were drawn, Holy Cross High School officially opened in the still incomplete building. The support of interested parents and friends contributed greatly to the success of the school. With the first graduating class of 460 in June 1959, the school was well on its way to becoming the fine institution it is today.

One of Holy Cross' first storied athletic teams was their inaugural 1955 football team created by Coaches Gerry Begley and Bill Stetter. Coach Begley was a standout high school QB and was the back-up QB for the 1947 Notre Dame Heisman Award-winning QB John Lujack. While at Notre Dame, Begley played under legendary Coach Frank Leahy in the late 1940s winning 3 National Championships. This 1955 HC football team was only the beginning of a football program that would quickly reach nationally recognized prominence and produce many highly touted college recruits. Coach Begley was succeeded by Coach Guido Maiola and then the highly respected and successful football Coach Robert Griffin who would guide HC to their 1963 (1st school championship) and 1965 New York City championships before becoming the head coach for Idaho State, the University of Rhode Island, and QBs Coach/Offensive Coordinator of the College of the Holy Cross.

Holy Cross began as a comprehensive high school offering college preparatory courses in addition to conducting programs in industrial arts and general studies. It is now entirely college prep, with about 98% of its graduates continuing their higher education in schools throughout the country. It was during the McGovern tenure (75-81) that the governance structure of the school was changed from a completely religious (CSC) board of trustees to a two-pronged board structure consisting of an ownership (Congregation of Holy Cross) board working in collaboration with a lay board of Directors (Executive Committee) appointed by the ownership group.  This structure was deemed nationally as an important innovation and has since been replicated by numerous religious congregations which run schools.  For many years McGovern promoted this structure annually at the convention of the National Catholic Educational Association where he also served in later years as National Public Policy Research Associate.

The school became co-ed starting in fall 2018.

Academics 
Holy Cross has always been a college preparatory school. When the school was first opened, they had an industrial arts program which included a print shop which printed, among other things, the school newspaper "The Lance". This program was discontinued during the principalship of Brother Aubert Harrigan, C.S.C. in favor of expanding the mission and purpose of the school as a more "college prep" environment.  A New York State Education Department official remarked to John McGovern, during his principalship (1975–1981), that the industrial arts program at Holy Cross "in the early days" distinguished the school in a national profile of Catholic secondary schools in the United States.  It was during the McGovern tenure that the school reached its highest enrollment (1400+).

Religious life 
Besides athletics, Holy Cross offers many intellectual pursuits such as, but not limited to: Campus Ministry, Student Government, and the National Honor Society (NHS). The Holy Cross Brothers still staff the school in various capacities; however as a result of governance changes instituted during the McGovern tenure in collaboration with provincial leadership, the school is operating under a "sponsorship" model with the Brothers of Holy Cross constituting the ownership board and a local Board of Directors constituting the management board. The religious philosophy is based on the mission of The Brothers of Holy Cross which were founded in Le Mans, France in 1835.

Notable alumni

Basketball
 Sylven Landesberg, American-Israeli professional basketball player in Israel for Maccabi Tel Aviv (Class of 2008)
Jermaine Bishop, college basketball player (Class of 2015)
Derrick Chievous, former basketball player for the Houston Rockets and Cleveland Cavaliers of the NBA (Class of 1984)
Evan Conti (born 1993), American-Israeli basketball player in Israel for Hapoel Be'er Sheva B.C., and basketball coach (Class of 2011)
Charles Jenkins, former basketball player for the Philadelphia 76ers of the NBA, attended his freshmen year. (Class of 2007)
Bob McIntyre, former basketball player for the New Jersey Americans and New York Nets of the ABA (Class of 1963)
Kyle O'Quinn, basketball player for the New York Knicks, transferred after sophomore year. (Class of 2008)
Mike Riordan, former basketball player for the New York Knicks and Baltimore/Capitol/Washington Bullets of the NBA; 1970 NBA Championship (NY Knicks); 1972–73 NBA All Defensive 2nd Team (Class of 1964)
Billy Schaeffer, former basketball player for the New York Nets and Virginia Squires of the ABA; 1974 ABA Championship (NY Nets) (Class of 1969)
Kevin Stacom, former basketball player for the Boston Celtics, Indiana Pacers and Milwaukee Bucks of the NBA (Class of 1969)
George Groom, former college basketball player for Fairfield University Class of 1973, where he still holds several records (Class of 1969)

Other notables
 Tom Cassese, former NFL and CFL football player
 Devon Cajuste, former NFL football player
 Dennis Golden, former college coach and president
 Pete Koegel, former MLB baseball player
 Dean Marlowe, NFL football player, Buffalo Bills (current)
 John Megna, played Dill in the original movie production of "To Kill A Mockingbird"
 Kevin Ogletree, former NFL football player
 John O'Leary, former CFL football player
 Dave Valle, former MLB baseball player
 Mark Lugris, former professional soccer player NY Cosmos/Dallas Sidekicks/Houston Dynamos-Puerto Rico National Team
 Nicholas Valle Gomez, engineering psychologist
 Mike Star - American actor
 Alijah Manzanilla, Rock Star
 Mike Repole, co-founder of Glaceau (maker of Vitaminwater
 John Devaney, American Actor.

References

External links
Holy Cross web page
National Center for Education Statistics data for Holy Cross High School
Holy Cross Brothers
Holy Cross building restoration

Holy Cross secondary schools
Educational institutions established in 1955
Roman Catholic Diocese of Brooklyn
Roman Catholic high schools in Queens, New York
Flushing, Queens
1955 establishments in New York City